John Calkin may refer to:
 John Baptiste Calkin, English composer, organist and music teacher
 John Williams Calkin, American mathematician